Cannon Air Force Base is a United States Air Force base, located approximately  southwest of Clovis, New Mexico. It is under the jurisdiction of Air Force Special Operations Command (AFSOC). The host unit at Cannon is the 27th Special Operations Wing (27 SOW), which activated on 1 October 2007. The 27 SOW plans and executes specialized and contingency operations using advanced aircraft, tactics and air refueling techniques to infiltrate, exfiltrate and resupply special operations forces (SOF) and provide intelligence, surveillance and reconnaissance and close air support in support of SOF operations.

A variety of special operations aircraft are stationed at Cannon, including the AC-130W Stinger II, AC-130J Ghostrider, MC-130J Commando II, MQ-9 Reaper, CV-22 Osprey and U-28 Draco.

History
Cannon Air Force Base is named in honor of General John K. Cannon (1892–1955). The history of the base began in the late 1920s, when a civilian passenger facility, Portair Field, was established on the site. Portair Field was used as a terminal for early commercial transcontinental flights, flew passengers in the Ford Trimotor "Tin Goose" by day, and used Pullman trains for night travel. In the 1930s Portair was renamed Clovis Municipal Airport.

World War II

After the United States entered World War II, the first military unit to use the facility was a glider detachment. On 6 July 1942 the base was assigned to Second Air Force. In 1943, the military began to use the facility as a bomber base. Clovis AAF was assigned to II Bomber Command, Second Air Force. On 8 April 1943, the base was renamed Clovis Army Air Field. The host unit at Clovis AAF was the 16th Bombardment Wing, a training unit for Consolidated B-24 Liberator bomber crews for Europe. The 16th Bomb Wing arrived in January 1943.

By mid-1946, the airfield was placed on reduced operational status due to postwar funding cutbacks and decreased flying activities. On 16 October 1946, the 234th AAFBU was inactivated and on 1 November 1946, the airfield was placed under the administrative control of Colorado Springs Army Air Base, Colorado. Clovis AAF was placed on temporarily inactive status on 28 May 1947.

Cold War
With the establishment of the United States Air Force (USAF) in September 1947, Clovis AAF was reactivated. The 509th Airdrome Group, Clovis Detachment took over day-to-day responsibilities for the airfield on 16 December 1947. The 509th operated Clovis AAF as a detachment from its headquarters at Roswell Army Air Field, New Mexico, using the airfield as a deployment facility for the group's B-29s. Clovis AAF was renamed "Clovis Air Force Base" on 13 January 1948. However, with no funds to host an active Strategic Air Command (SAC) bomb wing, Clovis AFB was placed on reserve/standby status on 1 July 1948. Its caretaker unit was the 234th Air Force Base Unit.

Clovis AFB remained on standby status until 1 April 1950 when jurisdiction was transferred from SAC to Air Training Command (ATC). ATC assigned the base as a sub post of Reese AFB, Texas on 12 May 1950, while construction ensued to bring the base up to USAF standards. Plans were made to make Clovis AFB a contract flying training facility, however, the advent of the Korean War changed the USAF's plans for Clovis and jurisdiction was transferred to Tactical Air Command (TAC) as a fighter base on 23 July 1951.

The first USAF unit to use Clovis AFB was the Air National Guard's 140th Fighter-Bomber Wing (140th FBW), which arrived in October 1951 after being activated due to the Korean War. The 140th FBW was a composite unit, made up of elements from the Colorado, Utah and Wyoming Air National Guards.

From the early 1970s to the early 1990s Cannon AFB was the sole operator of the F-111D Aardvark tactical fighter bomber. The F-111D aircraft were operated by the 522nd, 523rd, and 524th Tactical Fighter Squadrons. The mesas and canyons of the largely unpopulated terrain in eastern New Mexico were ideal for training crews to use the F-111s terrain following radar. To obtain crew practice dropping ordinance, the F-111s used the nearby Melrose bomb range.

21st century

On 13 May 2005, the Secretary of Defense recommended that Cannon Air Force Base be closed as part of the Base Realignment and Closure Commission (BRAC) process. However, on 25 August 2005, the BRAC Commission overturned the recommendation that the base be closed, but upheld the withdrawal of the base's F-16 Fighting Falcon fighter aircraft. The USAF had until 31 December 2009 to propose a new use for Cannon AFB, otherwise the base would be closed in 2010. Cannon AFB attempted to reopen a rejected EIS alternative, by substituting an Environmental Assessment. Comments were accepted through 4 October 2010.

On 20 June 2006, it was announced that Cannon AFB would transfer from Air Combat Command (ACC) and become an Air Force Special Operations Command (AFSOC) installation. Initial word was that the 16th Special Operations Wing would transfer from Hurlburt Field, Florida. It was later decided that the 27th Fighter Wing would transfer from ACC to AFSOC and become the 27th Special Operations Wing. This action would entail expanding and realigning some aspects of both the 16th Special Operations Wing and AFSOC, also headquartered at Hurlburt Field. This designation means that the base will receive new aircraft to replace the F-16s lost in the BRAC realignment. Jurisdiction was formally transferred to AFSOC on 1 October 2007 and new airframes such as the CV-22 Osprey and AC-130H Spectre were assigned to the new wing at Cannon.

Role and operations

Base units include:

 27th Special Operations Group
 One of four groups assigned to the 27th Special Operations Wing. The group accomplishes global special operations taskings as a USAF component member of the United States Special Operations Command. It conducts infiltration/ exfiltration, combat support, helicopter, and tilt-rotor aerial refueling, psychological warfare, and other special missions. It directs the deployment, employment, training, and planning for seven squadrons that operate the CV-22 Osprey, AC-130W Stinger II, MC-130J, MQ-1B Predator, MQ-9 Reaper, and various light and medium transport aviation.
 27th Special Operations Maintenance Group
 Composed of the 27th Special Operations Aircraft Maintenance Squadron, 27th Special Operations Component Maintenance Squadron, 27th Special Operations Equipment Maintenance Squadron and the 27th Special Operations Maintenance Operations Squadron. There is approximately 420 personnel assigned to the group. The 27 SOMXG vision of "The Power in Airpower!" is accomplished daily through innovation, teamwork, integrity and professionalism. The group supports the aircraft of the 27th Special Operations Wing through integrated maintenance support of the AFSOC mission. The 27 SOMXG maintains weapon systems, equipment and vehicles; sustains combat readiness; manages maintenance resources; and provides maintenance services. Most importantly, they prepare, support and execute contingency plans for worldwide mobilization, deployment and employment of wing aircraft.
 27th Special Operations Mission Support Group
 Provides base support and services activities to ensure mission readiness of the 27th Special Operations Wing, including housing, facility construction and maintenance, food service, law enforcement, fire protection, communications, personnel support, lodging, recreation, environmental management, contracting, supply, transportation, logistics plans and other base services.
 27th Special Operations Medical Group
 Provides base medical services activities to ensure mission readiness of the 27th Special Operations Wing.

Based units 
Flying and notable non-flying units based at Cannon Air Force Base.

Units marked GSU are Geographically Separate Units, which although based at Cannon, are subordinate to a parent unit based at another location.

United States Air Force 
Air Force Special Operations Command (AFSOC)

 27th Special Operations Wing (Host)
 Headquarters 27th Special Operations Wing
 27th Special Operations Air Operations Squadron
 27th Special Operations Comptroller Squadron
 27th Special Operations Group
 3rd Special Operations Squadron – MQ-9A Reaper
 9th Special Operations Squadron – MC-130J Commando II
 12th Special Operations Squadron – MQ-9A Reaper
 16th Special Operations Squadron – AC-130W Stinger II
 20th Special Operations Squadron – CV-22B Osprey
 27th Special Operations Support Squadron
 33rd Special Operations Squadron – MQ-9A Reaper
 56th Special Operations Intelligence Squadron
 318th Special Operations Squadron – U-28A
 27th Special Operations Mission Support Group
 27th Special Operations Civil Engineer Squadron 
 27th Special Operations Communications Squadron 
 27th Special Operations Contracting Squadron 
 27th Special Operations Force Support Squadron 
 27th Special Operations Logistics Readiness Squadron 
 27th Special Operations Security Forces Squadron
 27th Special Operations Maintenance Group
 27th Special Operations Maintenance Squadron
 27th Special Operations Aircraft Maintenance Squadron
 27th Special Operations Munitions Squadron
 727th Special Operations Aircraft Maintenance Squadron
 27th Special Operations Medical Group
 27th Special Operations Health Care Operational Squadron
 27th Special Operations Operational Medical Readiness Squadron
 27th Special Operations Medical Support Squadron

 24th Special Operations Wing
 720th Special Tactics Group
 26th Special Tactics Squadron (GSU)
Air Combat Command
 Sixteenth Air Force
 363rd Intelligence, Surveillance and Reconnaissance Wing
 361st Intelligence, Surveillance and Reconnaissance Group
 43rd Intelligence Squadron (GSU)

Previous names
 Army Air Base, Clovis, 25 September 1942 (establishment)-7 April 1943
 Clovis Army Airfield, 8 April 1943 – 12 January 1948
 Clovis Air Force Base, 13 January 1948 – 7 June 1957
 Cannon Air Force Base, 8 June 1957–present

Previous operating units

 409th Base HQ and Air Base Sq, 24 December 1942
 234th AAF Base Unit, 25 March 1944 – 16 October 1947
 509th Airdrome Gp, Clovis Det, 16 December 1947
 234th AF Base Unit, 1 July 1948-c. April 1950
 Base inactive April 1950-1 October 1951
 140th Air Base Gp, 1 October 1951

 50th Air Base Gp, 1 January 1953
 4445th Air Base Sq, 25 June 1953
 388th Air Base Gp, 23 November 1953
 312th Air Base Gp, 7 October 1954
 832d Air Base Gp, 8 October 1957 (rdsgd 832d Combat Support Gp, 1 October 1962)
 27th Combat Support Gp, 8 June 1969 (redsg 27th Mission Support Gp, 1 October 1992)-Present

Major units assigned

 11th Altitude Training Unit, 22 July 1943 – 1 April 1944
 234th Army Air Force (later Air Force) Base Unit (later 4000 Base Services Sq), 1 April 1944 – 1 April 1950
 301st Bombardment Group, 4 August 1946 – 16 July 1947
 140th Fighter-Bomber Group (NM ANG), 5 July 1951 – 1 January 1963
 50th Fighter-Bomber Wing, 1–23 July 1953
 388th Fighter-Bomber Wing, 23 November 1953 – 28 November 1954

 312th Fighter-Bomber Wing, 1 October 1954 – 18 February 1959
 474th Fighter-Bomber Wing, 8 October 1957 – 20 January 1968
 832d Air Division, 8 October 1957 – 1 July 1975
 27th Tactical Fighter Wing (TAC - Tactical Air Command), 18 February 1959 – 1 June 1992
 27th Fighter Wing (ACC - Air Combat Command), 1 June 1992 - 1 October 2007
 27th Special Operations Wing, 1 October 2007–present

Geography and demographics

As of the census of 2000, there were 2,557 people, 921 households, and 575 families residing on the base. The population density was 481.8 people per square mile (185.9/km). There were 1,087 housing units at an average density of 204.8 per square mile (79.0/km). The racial makeup of the residents was 68.0% White, 13.3% African American, 0.7% Native American, 5.7% Asian, 0.3% Pacific Islander, 6.1% from other races, and 5.9% from two or more races. 12.1% of the population were Hispanic or Latino of any race.

There were 921 households, out of which 37.5% had children under the age of 18 living with them, 56.9% were married couples living together, 4.2% had a female householder with no husband present, and 37.5% were non-families. 37.4% of all households were made up of individuals, and 0.0% had someone living alone who was 65 years of age or older. The average household size was 2.16 and the average family size was 2.82.

On the base the population was spread out, with 20.2% under the age of 18, 52.8% from 18 to 24, 26.2% from 25 to 44, 0.8% from 45 to 64, and 0.0% who were 65 years of age or older. The median age was 22 years. For every 100 females, there were 153.4 males. For every 100 females age 18 and over, there were 171.4 males.

The median income for a household on the base was $18,465, and the median income for a family was $25,573. Males had a median income of $15,546 versus $14,635 for females. The per capita income for the base was $11,562. 12.0% of the population and 11.5% of families were below the poverty line, including 14.0% of those under the age of 18 and 0.0% of those 65 and older.

Environmental contamination
In 2021 the Air Force was looking to see if the community was interested in establishing a Restoration Advisory Board at the Cannon Air Force Base to discuss Air Force environmental restoration activities, especially given Per- and polyfluoroalkyl substances contamination. The commander concluded there was not enough interest in forming a RAB, as only 4 people were willing to serve.

See also

 List of United States Air Force installations
New Mexico World War II Army Airfields

References

Other sources

 
 
 Maurer, Maurer. Air Force Combat Units of World War II. Washington, DC: U.S. Government Printing Office 1961 (republished 1983, Office of Air Force History).
 Ravenstein, Charles A. Air Force Combat Wings Lineage and Honors Histories 1947–1977. Maxwell Air Force Base, Alabama: Office of Air Force History 1984. .
 Mueller, Robert, Air Force Bases Volume I, Active Air Force Bases Within the United States of America on 17 September 1982, Office of Air Force History, 1989
 Active Air Force Bases Within the United States of America on 17 September 1982 USAF Reference Series, Office of Air Force History, United States Air Force, Washington, D.C., 1989
 Baugher, Joe. USAAS-USAAC-USAAF-USAF Aircraft Serial Numbers—1908 to present. USAAS-USAAC-USAAF-USAF Aircraft Serial Numbers—1908 to present
 Martin, Patrick, Tail Code: The Complete History of USAF Tactical Aircraft Tail Code Markings, 1994
 Menard, David W. USAF Plus Fifteen – A Photo History 1947 – 1962. Lancaster, PA: Schiffere Books,1993. .
 Rogers, Brian, United States Air Force Unit Designations Since 1978, 2005

External links

 
 
 
 Cannon Air Force Base, environmental issues United States Air Force Website

Installations of the United States Air Force in New Mexico
1943 establishments in New Mexico
Installations of Strategic Air Command
Curry County, New Mexico
Census-designated places in New Mexico
Airfields of the United States Army Air Forces in New Mexico
Buildings and structures in Curry County, New Mexico
Census-designated places in Curry County, New Mexico
Airports in New Mexico
Military airbases established in 1943
Military in New Mexico